Dayana Yastremska was the defending champion, but chose to participate in Nottingham instead.

Sara Errani won the title, defeating Barbara Haas in the final, 6–1, 6–4.

Seeds

Draw

Finals

Top half

Bottom half

References

Main Draw

Torneo Internazionale Femminile Antico Tiro a Volo - Singles